The Texas City Terminal Railway is an American terminal railroad that operates  of track at the Port of Texas City in Texas City, Texas. Established in 1921, the TCTR is jointly owned by the Union Pacific Railroad and BNSF Railway.

External links

Texas City Terminal Railroad Website

References

Switching and terminal railroads
Texas railroads
Union Pacific Railroad
BNSF Railway
Texas City, Texas
1921 establishments in Texas